This article lists fellows of the Royal Society elected in 1966.

Fellows

Sir Alan Rushton Battersby
Thomas Brooke Benjamin
Kenneth George Budden
Robert Ernest Davies
Sir Richard Doll
Sir Samuel Frederick Edwards
John Samuel Forrest
Francis Charles Fraser
Harry Harris
Donald Olding Hebb
Sir William Kenneth Hutchison
Alick Isaacs
Basil Kassanis
Ralph Ambrose Kekwick
Sir Percy Edward Kent
Desmond George King-Hele
Sir Francis Gerald William Knowles
Georg Kreisel
Sir Cyril Edward Lucas
James Dwyer McGee
Sir James Woodham Menter
Arthur Ernest Mourant
Egon Sharpe Pearson
Donald Hill Perkins
Lillian Mary Pickford
Heinz Otto Schild
Herbert Muggleton Stanley
Bruce Arnold Dunbar Stocker
John Sutton
Michael Szwarc
David Hardy Whiffen
Sir Frederick White

Foreign members

Jean Brachet
Haldan Keffer Hartline
Louis Eugene Felix Neel
Andre Weil

Statute 12 fellow

Louis Mountbatten, 1st Earl Mountbatten of Burma

References

1966 in science
1966
1966 in the United Kingdom